The 2003 Iowa State Cyclones football team represented Iowa State University as a member of the North Division of the Big 12 Conference during the 2003 NCAA Division I-A football season. Led by ninth-year head coach Dan McCarney, the Cyclones combined an overall record of 2–10 with a mark of 0–8 in conference play, placing last out of six team in the Big 12's North Division. The team played its home games at Jack Trice Stadium in Ames, Iowa.

Schedule

Roster

References

Iowa State
Iowa State Cyclones football seasons
Iowa State Cyclones football